Nimgaon Mhalungi is a village located in the Shirur subdivision of Pune district, Maharashtra.

It is situated on the banks of Kamini river.

References

Villages in Pune district